D-glycero-alpha-D-manno-heptose 1-phosphate guanylyltransferase (hddC (gene), gmhD (gene)) is an enzyme with systematic name GTP:D-glycero-alpha-D-manno-heptose 1-phosphate guanylyltransferase. This enzyme catalyses the following chemical reaction

 D-glycero-alpha-D-manno-heptose 1-phosphate + GTP  GDP-D-glycero-alpha-D-manno-heptose + diphosphate

The enzyme is involved in biosynthesis of GDP-D-glycero-alpha-D-manno-heptose.

References

External links 
 

EC 2.7.7